The Allegheny County Library Association (ACLA) is an organization based in Western Pennsylvania.  Formed in 1991, as an effort to encourage county libraries to collaborate and share resources, ACLA became recognized as a non-profit in 1994.  ACLA is based in Pittsburgh's West End neighborhood.

ACLA has 46 member libraries.

History of ACLA

ACLA's story began in 1991 when the County Controller's office issued “A Quiet Crisis: Libraries in Allegheny County.” The report detailed the dismal state of County libraries, each working independently of one another without any centralized coordination or communication structure. The report challenged the collective community to increase funding to improve services. In response the Allegheny County Library Association was established, becoming a 501(c)(3) corporation in 1994. It was one of the charter contractual assets to receive funding through the Allegheny Regional Asset District (ARAD). Allegheny County has 130 independent municipalities, making large-scale cooperation rare and extremely difficult. Yet ACLA has succeeded in becoming a model for delivering service across municipal boundaries.

Overcoming the “Quiet Crisis” 25 Years Later

2016 marked the 25th anniversary when Frank Lucchino, then Controller of Allegheny County, issued a special report – “A Quiet Crisis: Libraries in Allegheny County.”  This nearly 100-page report offered an in-depth discussion on the state of the libraries in Allegheny County and the problems each of the independent institutions faced.

With the “Information Age” emerging, libraries were struggling to keep up in providing residents with quick access to research materials and critical resources.  Allegheny County also was ranked at the bottom for per capita dollars spent on libraries throughout the nation.

The report included recommendations in the form of 10 steps (outlined below) for better citizen access and to address several key challenges – insufficient funding, deteriorating facilities, a shift in population from the urban core, and increasing use of the independent suburban libraries.

The report concluded that Allegheny County's libraries needed to identify a stable source of operating support and establish a broad based organization to take advantage of potential economies of scale.  A Commission on the Future of Libraries in Allegheny County (CFLAC) was charged with addressing the recommendations in the report.  Out of the Commission's work, came the formation of the Allegheny County Library Association (ACLA).

Twenty-five years later, ACLA, with the cooperation of its 46 Member Libraries, has met the challenges identified in “A Quiet Crisis” in ways that couldn't have been imagined in the early 1990s.   Allegheny County's libraries have many more resources at their disposal and are better positioned to meet the increased demand from residents for services in education and community enhancement.

While it is important to celebrate the success over the 25 years, ACLA and its Member Libraries will continue to face challenges as we move into the future.  Constant changes in technology, pressure on the Allegheny Regional Asset District to fund a wider range of assets, the growing demands of residents for current information and new formats, and the continued need to diversify library funding are just a few issues that remain.  However, the main foundation of county-wide cooperation has been established, allowing ACLA and its members to reach their goals.

Accomplishments since "A Quiet Crisis" was released

ACLA Board of Directors; 2019
Jack Murtagh (President),
Pamela Golden (Vice President),
Rich Fuller (Treasurer),
Christine McIntosh (Secretary),
Sally Coyne,
Kristen McMahon, 
Patricia Shetler, 
Tracy Soska

Allegheny County Library Association Library members

ACLA is divided into five geographical regions:

References

External links

Libraries in Allegheny County, Pennsylvania
Allegheny
1991 establishments in Pennsylvania